Moeen Charif (born on May 15, 1972; Yammoune, Lebanon) is a Lebanese singer. His public appreciates and respects him particularly for his commitment, his vibrant voice and his poetic lyrics

Biography
He started singing at age 9 and very quickly realized that music would be his calling. At age 12, he appeared as a child singer during the popular TV programme Layali Lubnan. He later learned playing the piano and oud. His meeting with the famous Lebanese singer and musician Wadih El Safi, an encounter that would be decisive for his career as Wadih El Safi decided to take him under his wing.

In 1994, he appeared on Studio El Fan and won great accolades. His first album after graduating from the programme was Rejou'ak that included six songs. Although the album proved to be a big hit, the signed contract with Studio El Fan and its owner Simon Asmar became a big source of trouble for Moeen Charif, problems that would pursue him for most of his artistic career. In 2002, his released his second album, Nassibi with seven tracks. Two years later, his fans would have the opportunity to listen to 2004 the album and in 2007 he released Albak Tayeb, produced by Rotana Records after moving to the label. In 2006, he married Mira Cherif.

Discography
Albums
Rejou'ak (رجوعك) 
Nassibi (نصيبي)
2004
Albak Tayyeb (قلبك طيب)

Songs
 "As'aab kelmeh" (اصعب كلمة)
 "Shoo byeshbahak teshreen" (شو بيشبهك تشرين)

References

External links
Facebook

20th-century Lebanese male singers
1972 births
Living people
21st-century Lebanese male singers